Lebeda is a genus of moths in the family Lasiocampidae. The genus was erected by Francis Walker in 1855.

Species
Lebeda agnata Tams, 1928 
Lebeda brauni Lajonquière, 1979 
Lebeda cognata Grunberg, 1913 
Lebeda intermedia Holloway, 1987
Lebeda nobilis Walker, 1855
Lebeda pruetti Holloway, 1987

References

External links

Lasiocampinae